Murray Upper is a rural locality in the Cassowary Coast Region, Queensland, Australia. In the  Murray Upper had a population of 266 people.

Geography 
The Murray River rises in Murray Upper and enters the Coral Sea at neighbouring Bilyana. Almost all of the locality is mountainous (rising to peaks of about 900 metres about sea level) and is within the Girramay National Park. Only a small area in the north-east of the locality is outside the national park and is flat land about 20 metres about sea level and this land is used for farming with sugarcane and bananas being important crops. A cane tramway passes through the farming area to carry the sugarcane to the sugar mill at Tully.

History 
Girramay (also known as Giramay, Garamay, Giramai, Keramai) is a language of Far North Queensland, particularly the area around Herbert River Catchment taking in the towns of Bilyana, Cardwell and Ingham. The Girramay language region includes the landscape within the local government boundaries of Cassowary Coast and Hinchinbrook Regional Councils.

Murray River Upper Provisional School opened on 18 January 1904. It became Murray River Upper State School on 1 October 1904. It closed temporarily due to low student numbers in 1910, 1922, July 1924 to July 1925, and 16 May 1927 to 4 November 1934.

In the  Murray Upper had a population of 266 people.

Education 
Murray River Upper State School is a government co-education primary (P-6) school at 1 Middle Murray Road. In 2016, the school had an enrolment of 45 students with 4 teachers (3 full-time equivalent) and 7 non-teaching staff (3 full-time equivalent).

Attractions 
Murray Falls are a cascade waterfall on the Murray River within the Girramay National Park and form part of the Wet Tropics World Heritage Area. The falls can be viewed from a boardwalk and viewing platform.

References

Further reading

External links 

Cassowary Coast Region
Localities in Queensland